Saeed Ghani (born 8 July 1972) is a Pakistani politician who is currently serving as Provincial Minister of Sindh for Labour and Information and Human Resources.  He has been a member of the Provincial Assembly of Sindh since August 2018. Previously, he was a member of Provincial Assembly of Sindh from July 2017 to May 2018 and a member of the Senate of Pakistan.

Political career
He was elected to the Senate of Pakistan as a candidate of the Pakistan Peoples Party (PPP) in the 2012 Pakistani Senate election. In July 2017, he resigned from the Senate to run for a seat in the Provincial Assembly of Sindh.

He was elected to the Provincial Assembly of Sindh as candidate of PPP from Constituency PS-114 (Karachi-XXVI) in by-polls held in July 2017.

He was re-elected to the Provincial Assembly of Sindh as a candidate of PPP from Constituency PS-104 (Karachi East-VI) in the 2018 Pakistani general election.

On 19 August, he was inducted into the provincial Sindh cabinet of Chief Minister Syed Murad Ali Shah and was made Provincial Minister of Sindh for Local Government with the additional ministerial portfolios of Public Health Engineering and Rural Development, and Katchi Abadies.

On 5 August 2019, He was appointed as Provincial Minister of Sindh for Labour, Information and Archive.

He was appointed as Provincial Minister of Sindh for Education and Literacy and Human Resources succeeding Syed Sardar Ali Shah as Minister of Education as the CM Sindh Murad Ali Shah reshuffled the Cabinet of Sindh on 3 February 2020.
On 23 March 2020, He was tested positive for COVID-19 but his next test was negative.

On 5 August 2021, he was again appointed as Minister of Information Sindh and was later succeeded by Syed Sardar Ali Shah as Minister of Education.

References

Living people
Pakistani senators (14th Parliament)
1972 births
Pakistan People's Party MPAs (Sindh)
Sindh MPAs 2013–2018
Sindh MPAs 2018–2023
Provincial ministers of Sindh